The 1915 Cork Senior Hurling Championship was the 28th staging of the Cork Senior Hurling Championship since its establishment by the Cork County Board in 1887.

Midleton were the defending champions.

On 8 August 1915, Redmonds won the championship following a 4-01 to 0-01 defeat of Collegains in the final. This was their fourth championship title overall and their first title in 14 championship seasons.

Results

Second round

Quarter-finals

Semi-finals

Final

Miscellaneous

 Redmonds win their first title since 1901.
 Collegians became the first college side to qualify for the championship final.

References

Cork Senior Hurling Championship
Cork Senior Hurling Championship